Jean Ann Burgess (born 10 June 1962) has been Archdeacon of Bolton since March 2018.

Burgess was educated at the University of Nottingham and ordained in 2004.  After a curacy in Church Gresley she was priest in charge at St Alkmund and St Werburgh, Derby until her appointment as archdeacon.

References

1952 births
People educated at Bradford Grammar School
Alumni of Lincoln College, Oxford
Living people
Archdeacons of Bolton
People from Shipley, West Yorkshire